Sir Nicholas Throckmorton (or Throgmorton) (c. 1515/151612 February 1571) was an English diplomat and politician, who was an ambassador to France and later Scotland, and played a key role in the relationship between Elizabeth I of England and Mary, Queen of Scots.

Early years
Nicholas Throckmorton was the fourth of eight sons of Sir George Throckmorton of Coughton Court, near Alcester in Warwickshire and Katherine, daughter of Nicholas Vaux, 1st Baron Vaux of Harrowden and Elizabeth FitzHugh, the former Lady Parr. Nicholas was an uncle of the conspirator Francis Throckmorton. He was brought up in the households of members of the Parr family, including that of his cousin Catherine Parr, the last queen consort of Henry VIII. He got acquainted with young Lady Elizabeth when he was serving in the household of the dowager queen and her new husband Thomas Seymour, 1st Baron Seymour of Sudeley and became a close confidant. In his youth, he also became favourable to the Protestant Reformation.

After the execution of Lord Thomas Seymour in 1549 and the downfall of Protector Somerset later in the year, Throckmorton managed to distance himself from those affairs and eventually became the part of the circle of John Dudley, 1st Duke of Northumberland and confidant of the young king Edward VI.

He sat in Parliament from 1545 to 1567, initially as the member for Maldon and then from 1547 for Devizes (a seat previously held by his brother Clement Throckmorton). During the reign of Edward VI, he was in high favour with the regents.

In 1547, he was present at the Battle of Pinkie Cleugh during the invasion of Scotland. He was knighted in 1551, and the title included numerous benefits, including land grants, that gave him financial security. He held the post of under-treasurer at the Tower mint from 1549 to 1552. In March 1553, he was elected knight of the shire for Northamptonshire and then MP for Old Sarum (November 1553, which by then was already a rotten borough), Lyme Regis (1559) and Tavistock (1563).

Tudor successions
During the short-lived attempt to place Lady Jane Grey on the throne after the death of Edward VI in 1553, Throckmorton tried to keep contact with both supporters of both her and Queen Mary I. Eventually, he began to support the latter.

However, in January 1554, he was suspected of complicity in Wyatt's Rebellion and arrested. Later historians have suspected he was at least involved, either because of his Protestantism or due to his dismay at the growing Spanish influence in the court.

Throckmorton was brought to trial at the Guildhall on 17 April 1554. He managed to convince the jury, which included Simon Lowe alias Fyfield, of his innocence, although the judges were openly hostile to him. They included Sir Roger Cholmeley, who was trying to impress Queen Mary. As a result of the verdict, the court fined and imprisoned the jury and sent Throckmorton to the Tower. When he was released the next year, he fled to exile in France. Though people wanted to put him on trial again, he was pardoned in 1557, and was employed by Queen Mary.

Elizabeth's court

Ambassador to France
After Elizabeth's accession in November 1558, Throckmorton rose rapidly into favour because of his personal acquaintance with her. He sent her advice on the formation of her government, some of which she followed and from May 1559 to April 1564, he was ambassador to France. He was appointed both Chief Butler of England and Chamberlain of the Exchequer in 1564 for life. He continued to send letters and messengers with advice to the Queen and she often took his advice.

Throckmorton acknowledged that Elizabeth had a central and active role in government, and in August 1560 he wrote to Elizabeth that peace between England and Scotland "dothe cheffely depend uppon your majesties order & conducte". During these years in France, Throckmorton became acquainted with Mary, Queen of Scots. He conducted the negotiations with the English court regarding her travel arrangements when she decided to return to Scotland from France. Though he supported the Reformation, he became her close friend, willing to assist her and do her personal favours.

As an ambassador, Throckmorton encouraged Elizabeth to aid the Huguenots, and he surreptitiously took a part in the war of religion. Throckmorton was allowed leave from his duties in October 1559 to visit his sick wife in England. Henry Killigrew was left as his deputy. When Throckmorton returned to France in 1560, the Roman Catholic leader Francis, Duke of Guise imprisoned him as a persona non grata. Guise was convinced that Throckmorton had been involved with the Tumult of Amboise, a Huguenot plot. Throckmorton later remarked that he was afraid he would be killed, but he was released and retained his post as an ambassador.

In 1562, when religious violence began to intensify in France, Throckmorton wanted to support the mediation efforts of Catherine de' Medici. Later in 1562, when the Huguenot Prince of Condé had taken over Newhaven (modern-day Le Havre) in April, Throckmorton convinced the Queen to send military aid to the Huguenots in what was later called the Newhaven expedition. English troops garrisoned Le Havre in October 1562, but soon fell afoul of the Huguenots and, after the negotiations, the Huguenots turned against the English. After an outbreak of plague, they had to surrender the next year. Catherine de' Medici was suspicious of Throckmorton's schemes, however, and when Elizabeth sent him to negotiate with her in 1563, she placed him under house arrest. Elizabeth sent Sir Thomas Smith to negotiate his release. The two men soon began to dislike each other and in one stage almost came to blows, but Throckmorton was eventually released in 1564.

Envoy to Mary, Queen of Scots
After Throckmorton's return to England, the Queen sent him as an ambassador to Scotland in May 1565. His mission was to prevent the marriage of Queen Mary and Darnley. He went to Stirling Castle on 15 May 1565 where ceremonies were being held to grant Darnley and his followers new titles. At first, he was refused entry to the castle, then Mary agreed to speak with him. The marriage went ahead in Edinburgh on 16 July.

After the murder of Darnley, Elizabeth sent Throckmorton to Scotland in June 1567. The Scottish lords had rebelled and captured Mary at Carberry Hill, and Elizabeth wished the lords to restore Mary to her authority. Throckmorton himself had recommended that Elizabeth should support the lords. Mary was held at Lochleven Castle and Throckmorton was not allowed to see her. On 25 July 1567, William Maitland of Lethington came to see Throckmorton. As instructed by Elizabeth, Throckmorton asked Lethington if the plan was to restore Mary to the throne. If so, Elizabeth promised to help prosecute Darnley's murder and preserve Prince James. Throckmorton recorded Lethington's personal answer, which outlined that English interference was not welcome at this time, and might even be counterproductive, and Throckmorton would not be allowed to see Mary;Being in place to knowe more than you can knowe, I saye unto yowe ..., in case you doe on the Quenes majesties behalf your mestris, presse this company to enlarge the Quene my soveraigne, and to suffer you to goe unto her, or doe use any thretnynge speache in those matters, the rather to compasse them (rather than achieve them), I assure you, you wyll put the Quene my soveraigne in greate jeopardye of her lyffe: and therefore there is none other waye for the present to do her good but to give place and use mildness.

Elizabeth repeated her instructions to Throckmorton by letter on 27 July 1567. Elizabeth told Throckmorton he should argue that the lords had deposed Mary against scriptural law, citing Paul's letter to the Romans. Elizabeth noted that as she planned not to send financial aid to the rebel lords, there was a risk they might renew the Auld Alliance with France. Throckmorton was not to give a signal of approval or confirmation to the rebellion by attending the coronation of the infant Prince James as ambassador. Throckmorton sent his junior assistant Henry Middlemore to the coronation instead of going himself.

Throckmorton was working against his own advice and had contradictory orders from both his Queen and Sir William Cecil. The Scottish lords knew him as a friend of Mary and as a supporter of her claim to be a successor to Elizabeth, so he was an unwelcome guest. Some of Elizabeth's messages also offended the lords. Throckmorton was recalled in August after he offended Elizabeth by showing his instructions to the Scottish lords.

In 1569, Throckmorton was suspected of involvement in the Duke of Norfolk's conspiracy in favour of Mary, and was imprisoned for a time at Windsor. Throckmorton may have erroneously believed Norfolk's idea would suit the wishes of the Queen. He was not put on trial, but did not regain the Queen's confidence afterwards.

Throckmorton died on 12 February 1571. He is buried in St Katharine Cree parish church, Leadenhall Street, London.

Family and legacy
Throckmorton married Anne Carew, daughter of Sir Nicholas Carew, a Knight of the Garter and his wife Elizabeth Bryan, and they had 10 sons including Sir Nicholas Throckmorton and three daughters. Their daughter Elizabeth became the wife of Sir Walter Raleigh. After his death, Anne married Adrian Stokes, the second husband, and former Master of Horse of Frances Grey, Duchess of Suffolk.

Contemporary political figures regarded Throckmorton with respect. One of these was Sir Francis Walsingham who had worked with Throckmorton in France. In 1560 William Cecil said he would be prepared to resign if Throckmorton would take his place and spoke well of him after his death, in spite of their constant disagreements. Some contemporaries also suspected Throckmorton was the éminence grise behind Robert Dudley.

At the time of his death, Throckmorton held the posts of the keeper of Brigstock Park, Northamptonshire; Justice of the Peace in Northamptonshire; and Chief Butler of England and Wales. London's Throgmorton Street is named after him.

Notes

References

 
 
 
 Biography from the History of Parliament

External links
 

 Portrait of Sir Nicholas in the National Portrait Gallery

1510s births
1571 deaths
16th-century English diplomats
Ambassadors of England to France
Ambassadors of England to Scotland
Court of Mary, Queen of Scots
English knights
English MPs 1545–1547
English MPs 1547–1552
English MPs 1553 (Edward VI)
English MPs 1553 (Mary I)
English MPs 1559
English MPs 1563–1567
People from Alcester
Members of the Parliament of England for Tavistock
Prisoners in the Tower of London
Recipients of English royal pardons
Nicholas
Members of Parliament for Maldon
Knights Bachelor
English justices of the peace

es:Nicholas Throckmorton#top